Roger S. Gottlieb (born October 20, 1946) is professor of philosophy and Paris Fletcher Distinguished Professor in the Humanities at Worcester Polytechnic Institute. He has written or edited 21 books, including two Nautilus Book Awards winners, and over 150 papers on philosophy, political theory, (environmental) ethics, religious studies, (religious) environmentalism, religious life, contemporary spirituality, the Holocaust, and disability. He is internationally known for his work as a leading analyst and exponent of religious environmentalism, for his passionate and moving account of spirituality in an age of environmental crisis, and for his innovative and humane description of the role of religion in a democratic society.

Gottlieb has edited six academic book series (which have collectively published more than 50 titles), serves on the editorial boards of several academic journals, is contributing editor to Tikkun Magazine, and has appeared online on Patheos, Huffington, Grist, Wall Street Journal, Washington Post, Real Clear Religion, and many others. His writings have appeared in top academic journals (such as The Journal of Philosophy, Journal of the American Academy of Religion, Conservation Biology, and Ethics); in popular publications (such as E Magazine online, The Boston Globe, and Orion Afield); and in anthologies of Jewish writing, environmental ethics, religious life, spirituality, the Holocaust, and disability; and in the Encyclopedia of Philosophy.

Life
Roger S. Gottlieb was born on October 20, 1946, in White Plains, New York, where he grew up in a middle-class suburban family. He graduated from White Plains High School in 1964. From there he went on to Brandeis University intending to become a psychologist, but after one course found it "unbelievably dull" and soon became hooked on philosophy. He earned a BA (Summa Cum Laude, Phi Beta Kappa, Special Honors) in philosophy in 1968 and a Ph.D. 1975.

He was a visiting assistant professor from 1974 to 1977 at University of Connecticut and 1978 to 1980 at Tufts University. In 1980–1981 he was awarded a National Endowment for the Humanities Fellowship, and in 1981 was hired as a professor of philosophy at Worcester Polytechnic Institute where he was granted tenure in 1985, and appointed Paris Fletcher Distinguished Professor from 1995 to 1997. Since 2006, he has also been a visiting professor of Jewish studies at Wake Forest University divinity school.

Gottlieb lives in Boston with his wife, noted psychotherapist and author Miriam Greenspan, and shares in the care of his daughters, Anna and Esther. Their first child (a son) was born with brain damage, living only five days without coming home from the hospital. Three years later they had a third child, Esther, who was born with multiple handicaps. Gottlieb recounts how these events had a profound impact on him and forced him to grow spiritually. The spiritual and political dimensions of his relation to Esther, who has multiple disabilities, forms part of Chapter 8 of Joining Hands.

Gottlieb is affiliated with the Jewish Renewal movement. His brother is Dovid Gottlieb (a Haredi Rabbi).

Professional associations
 American Philosophical Association
 American Academy of Religion 
 steering committee, Religion and Ecology Section, 1994–97, 2009–12
 steering committee, Religion and Disability Section, 2002-2007
 Sustainability Task Force
 International Society for the Study of Environmental Ethics
 American Political Science Association
 Philosophical Society for the Study of Genocide and the Holocaust (co-founder)
 Radical Philosophy Association
 Interdisciplinary Environmental Association

Selected works

 History and Subjectivity: The Transformation of Marxist Theory. Temple University Press, 1987; Humanities Press Paperback edition, 1993.
 An Anthology of Western Marxism: From Lukacs and Gramsci to Socialist-Feminism. Oxford University Press, 1989.
 Thinking the Unthinkable: Meanings of the Holocaust. Paulist Press, 1990.
 Marxism 1844-1990: Origins, Betrayal, Rebirth. Routledge, 1992.
 The Ecological Community: Environmental Challenges for Philosophy, Politics, and Morality. Routledge, 1996.
 A Spirituality of Resistance: Finding a Peaceful Heart and Protecting the Earth. Crossroad, 1999; Paperback edition, with a new ‘Afterword.’ Rowman and Littlefield, 2003.
 Joining Hands: Religion and Politics Together for Social Change. Westview Press, 2002, Paperback edition, 2004.
 Liberating Faith: Religious Voices for Justice, Peace, and Ecological Wisdom. Rowman and Littlefield, 2003.
 This Sacred Earth: Religion, Nature, Environment. Second Edition. Routledge, 2003.
 A Greener Faith: Religious Environmentalism and our Planet’s Future. Oxford University Press, 2006; paperback edition, with a new preface, 2009.
 The Oxford Handbook of Religion and Ecology. Oxford University Press, 2006; paperback, 2010.
 Religion and the Environment, Volumes 1-IV. Routledge, 2010
 Engaging Voices: Tales of Morality and Meaning in an Age of Global Warming. Baylor University Press, 2011.
 Spirituality: What It Is and Why It Matters. Oxford University Press, 2012.
 Political and Spiritual: Essays on Religion, Environment, Disability, and Justice. Rowman and Littlefield, 2015.
 Morality and the Environmental Crisis. Cambridge University Press, 2019.

See also
 Deep Ecology
 Ecospirituality
 Ecotheology
 Environmentalism
 Environmental communication
 Environmental education
 Environmental sociology
 Environmental studies
 Environmental theology
 Human ecology
 Judaism and environmentalism
 List of environmental philosophers
 List of political theorists
 Political ecology
 Religion and environmentalism
 Stewardship (theology)

Notes

References

Further reading
These contain details about his main works & ideas (that should be added to article at some point):
 
 "Gottlieb, Roger S. 1946- ." Contemporary Authors.. Encyclopedia.com.
 Bio page on university site

External links
 Official website
 On academia.edu
 On ResearchGate
 Bio page on university site

1946 births
20th-century American educators
20th-century American essayists
20th-century American philosophers
21st-century American educators
21st-century American essayists
21st-century American non-fiction writers
21st-century American philosophers
21st-century American short story writers
Activists from Boston
Activists from New York (state)
American ethicists
American male essayists
American male non-fiction writers
American non-fiction environmental writers
American philosophy academics
American religion academics
American spiritual writers
Brandeis University alumni
Ecotheology
Educators from New York (state)
Environmental ethicists
Environmental fiction writers
Environmental philosophers
Environmental studies scholars
Green thinkers
Jewish American academics
Jewish American activists
Jewish ethicists
Jewish non-fiction writers
Judaic scholars
Jewish socialists
Living people
North American environmentalists
People from White Plains, New York
Philosophers from Massachusetts
Philosophers from New York (state)
Philosophers of Judaism
Philosophers of religion
Philosophy writers
Religious studies scholars
Political philosophers
Tufts University faculty
Wake Forest University faculty
White Plains High School alumni
Worcester Polytechnic Institute faculty
Writers from Boston
20th-century American male writers
21st-century American male writers